Shosha, also known as churul or churu, is a type of soft cheese in Tibetan cuisine. Tibetan cheese is a staple food and is often made from animals suited to the climate such as yak and goat.  It is a pungent cheese compared with blue cheese. It is used to make beef dish, and churu cheese soup.

See also
 List of Tibetan dishes

References

Tibetan cheeses
Tibetan cuisine